Shane Patrick Bowers (born July 27, 1971) is an American former Major League Baseball pitcher who played for the Minnesota Twins in 1997.

Born in Glendora, California, Bowers went to Charter Oak High School in Covina, where he played baseball and basketball, before attending Loyola Marymount University. After being selected by the Twins in the 1993 Major League Baseball Draft, Bowers pitched for four different minor league teams from 1993 to 1996. In 1997, he played for the New Britain Rock Cats for two months, recording a 7–2 win–loss record and 3.41 earned run average (ERA) before receiving a promotion to the Salt Lake Buzz, the Twins' Triple-A team. He went 6–0 with the Buzz, earning a call-up to the major leagues by the Twins. His first major league appearance came on July 26 against the Baltimore Orioles; Bowers allowed one run in  innings pitched. He started five games for Minnesota in 1997 and posted an 0–3 record, with an 8.05 ERA. Bowers returned to the Buzz for the 1998 season, splitting time between starts and relief appearances and pitching through a fracture in his pitching arm.

In 2001, he went overseas to play for the Yokohama BayStars of Japan's Central League; he started 26 games, going 3–13 with a 4.39 ERA. The following season, he was 4–8 with a 3.77 ERA in 24 appearances. In 2003, he pitched for the Hyundai Unicorns in South Korea, winning 13 games. Bowers last played in the minor leagues in 2004.

References

External links
Historical Player Stats: Shane Bowers

Shane Bowers
Career statistics and player information from Korea Baseball Organization

1971 births
American expatriate baseball players in Japan
American expatriate baseball players in South Korea
Baseball players from California
Elizabethton Twins players
Fort Myers Miracle players
Fort Wayne Wizards players
Hardware City Rock Cats players
Hyundai Unicorns players
KBO League pitchers
Living people
Loyola Marymount Lions baseball players
Major League Baseball pitchers
Minnesota Twins players
New Britain Rock Cats players
Reading Phillies players
Salt Lake Buzz players
Scranton/Wilkes-Barre Red Barons players
Yokohama BayStars players